The  is a railway line owned and operated by Hokuriku Railroad in Ishikawa Prefecture, Japan. The line extends 13.8 km from the city of Kanazawa to Hakusan with a total of 16 stations.

Service
All services are all-stations "Local" trains which travel the entire length of the line, from Nomachi to Tsurugi; the trip takes approximately 30 minutes. During the New Year's Eve and New Year's Day holidays, the line was operated all night to move passengers to and from now-closed Kaga-Ichinomiya, where the nearby Shirayama-Hime Shrine draws crowds.

All trains are operated by drivers only; doors in the middle of each train car do not open.

Until November 30, 2006, there was daytime semi-express service between Nomachi and Tsurugi; trains stopped at Osano, Nonoichi, Sodani, and Oyanagi, making the trip in 25 minutes. This semi-express service was intended to move trains from one part of the line to the other in order to have a more balanced schedule.

On November 1, 2009, the section between Tsurugi and Kaga-Ichinomiya was closed.

Stations

Section closed in 2009

Rolling stock
Hokuriku Railroad uses ten 7000 series (formerly Tokyu 7000 series) and eleven 7700 series (formerly Keio 3000 series) electric multiple units (EMUs) on the Ishikawa Line. They are typically run in paired sets.

History

June 22, 1915: Ishikawa Electric Railway begins operating the 762mm gauge line between Shin-Nonoichi and Tsurugi stations, not electrified despite the company's name.
June 30, 1915: Ishikawa Electric Railway renamed to Ishikawa Railway
December 1, 1916: Kami-Nonoichi Station opens
August 1, 1921: Track gauge changed to 1,067 mm; electrified with 600 V DC overhead catenary
October 1, 1922: Nishi-Kanazawa — Shin-Nonoichi section opened by Kanazawa Electric Railway, through operation with Ishikawa Railway starts
May 1, 1923: Kanazawa Electric Railway absorbs Ishikawa Railway
September 5, 1925: Hinomiko Station opens
October 1, 1925: Nishi-Kanazawa Station renamed to Shiragikuchō Station; Shin-Nonoichi Station renamed to Shin-Nishi-Kanazawa Station; Kami-Nonoichi Station renamed to Nonoichi Station
August 17, 1927: Sanjūgari Station opens
December 28, 1927: Kinmei Railway opens Tsurugi — Jinjamae (now Kaga-Ichinomiya) section
March 11, 1929: Tsurugi — Jinjamae section transferred to Kanazawa Electric Railway
September 14, 1929: Tsurugi — Jinjamae section electrified
December 1, 1934: Nishi-Izumi Station opens
March 2, 1935: Awada Station opens
August 1, 1937: Inokuchi Station opens
December 8, 1937: Jinjamae Station renamed to Kaga-Ichinomiya Station
August 1, 1941: Hokuriku Gōdō Electric (now Hokuriku Electric Power Company) established; merges with Kanazawa Electric Railway
March 26, 1942: Hokuriku Gōdō Electric spins-off its transport division, establishes Hokuriku Railway
February 1, 1943: Magae Station opens
October 13, 1943: Hokuriku Railway, Kanaishi Electric Railway, Onsen Rail, Kinmei Railway, Noto Railway, etc. merge to form Hokuriku Railway
October 23, 1944: Through operation with the Shōkin Line begins
After 1946: Sanjūgari, Tsukihachi stations close
June 2, 1949: Through operation with the Nōmi Line begins
After April 1963: Awada Station renamed to Otomaru Station
April 11, 1963: Kami-Nonoichi Station renamed to Kōsen-Mae Station
July 15, 1965: Ōnuke Station renamed to Nuke-Jūtaku-Mae Station
September 15, 1966: Kōsen-Mae Station renamed to Nonoichi-Kōdai-Mae Station
April 1, 1970: Passenger operations on the Shiragikuchō — Nomachi section cease; freight-only operation continues
September 20, 1972: Shiragikuchō — Nomachi section closes
April 1, 1976: Freight operations cease
September 14, 1980: Nōmi Line closes
December 12, 1984: Kinmei Line operation stops
April 29, 1987: Kinmei Line closes
July 24, 1990: Driver-only operation begins
2002: Automatic Train Stop (ATS) system introduced
December 1, 2006: Semi-express trains abolished; entire line changes to local-only operation
November 1, 2009: Tsurugi — Kaga-Ichinomiya section closes
March 14, 2015: Hibari station opens

Former connecting lines
 Nomachi Station: In 1904, the 8 km, 915 mm gauge Matsukane horse-drawn tramway opened to Matto on the Hokuriku Main Line, and also connected with Nonoichi station on this line (not the current JR West station of the same name, which opened in 1968). In 1916, the line was converted to 1,067 mm gauge and electrified at 600 V DC. The line was acquired by the Kanazawa Electric Railway in 1920, which merged with the Hokuriku Railway in 1942. The 3 km Nonoichi to Nomachi section closed in 1944, and the remaining 5 km line closed in 1955.
 Tsurugi Station: The 17 km line to Yamashita was opened between 1926 and 1929, and electrified in 1949. Freight services ceased in 1971, and the line closed in 1983 after the Dainichigawa bridge was damaged by floodwaters. The Nomi Electric Railway opened a 17 km line, electrified at 600 V DC to Terai on the Hokuriku Main Line in 1927. Flooding destroyed the Tedorigawa bridge in 1934, which was replaced nine months later. The company merged with the Hokuriku Railway in 1942. Freight services ceased in 1968, and the line closed in 1980.

See also
 List of railway lines in Japan

References
This article incorporates material from the corresponding article in the Japanese Wikipedia

 
Railway lines in Japan
Rail transport in Ishikawa Prefecture
Railway lines opened in 1915
1067 mm gauge railways in Japan